The 2016–17 Lesotho Premier League is the 49th season of top-tier football in Lesotho. The season began on 27 August 2016 and concluded on 6 May 2017. Bantu won their second league title and will represent the Lesotho Premier League in the 2018 CAF Champions League.

The league is comprised 14 teams with the bottom two, Butha-Buthe Warriors and Rovers being relegated to the 2017-18 A Division.

Teams
A total of 14 teams will contest the league, including 12 sides from the 2015–16 season and two promoted from the 2015–16 A Division, Butha-Buthe Warriors and Sky Battalion.
On the other hand, Likila United and Mphatlalatsane were the last two teams of the 2015–16 season and will play in A Division for the 2016-17 season. Lioli are the defending champions from the 2015–16 season.

Stadiums and locations

League table

Positions by round

References

Football leagues in Lesotho
Premier League
Premier League
Lesotho